Ghenadie Dudoglo (born ) is a Moldovan male weightlifter, competing in the 62 kg category and representing Moldova at international competitions. He competed at world championships, including at the 2015 World Weightlifting Championships.

In 2015 the International Weightlifting Federation (IWF) has suspended Ghenadie Dudoglo for anti-doping rule violation, after he returned a positive sample for anabolic agents (dehydrochlormethyltestosterone).

Major results

References

1986 births
Living people
Moldovan male weightlifters
Place of birth missing (living people)
Doping cases in weightlifting
Moldovan sportspeople in doping cases
21st-century Moldovan people